The Jordan FA Cup is Jordan's premier knockout tournament in men's football (soccer), Al-Faisaly have the record for the most FA Cup wins in their history with a total of 21 titles, followed by Al-Wehdat with 11. Participates in the tournament 42 clubs that represents the Jordanian Pro League and the Jordan League Division 1 and the Jordan League Division 2. The tournament is controlled by the Jordan Football Association.

The winner gains entry to the AFC Cup.

Winners by year

Performance by club

Trophies

Finals

Results by team

References

External links
 Cup at soccerway.com
 Jordan Cup - Hailoosport.com (Arabic)
 Jordan Cup - Hailoosport.com
 
 

 
FA Cup
National association football cups
1980 establishments in Jordan